Skorodumka is a rural locality (a village) in Razdolyevskoye Rural Settlement, Kolchuginsky District, Vladimir Oblast, Russia. The population was 14 as of 2010.

Geography 
Skorodumka is located on the Ilmovka River, 15 km southeast of Kolchugino (the district's administrative centre) by road. Lavrenikha is the nearest rural locality.

References 

Rural localities in Kolchuginsky District